Chris Stanley (born June 18, 1979) is a Canadian professional ice hockey player who is currently playing with the Fischtown Pinguins in the German 2nd Bundesliga. He was selected by the Vancouver Canucks in the 4th round (90th overall) of the 1997 NHL Entry Draft. He attended Brooklyn Technical High School.

Awards and honours

References

External links

1979 births
Living people
Belleville Bulls players
Canadian ice hockey centres
Dornbirn Bulldogs players
Asiago Hockey 1935 players
Laredo Bucks players
Las Vegas Wranglers players
SC Riessersee players
Vancouver Canucks draft picks
Brooklyn Technical High School alumni
Canadian expatriate ice hockey players in Austria
Canadian expatriate ice hockey players in Italy
Canadian expatriate ice hockey players in Germany